Eric James Charlton (born 17 March 1938) is a former Australian politician.

Charlton was elected to the Western Australian Legislative Council in 1984 as a National Party member for Agricultural Region, replacing the deceased MLC Gordon Atkinson. He served in the Council until his resignation in 1998. In 1993 he was appointed Minister for Transport in Richard Court's Coalition government, a position he held until his retirement from politics.

References

1938 births
Living people
National Party of Australia members of the Parliament of Western Australia
Members of the Western Australian Legislative Council
People from Cunderdin, Western Australia